Hacks is an American comedy-drama television series created by Lucia Aniello, Paul W. Downs, and Jen Statsky that premiered on May 13, 2021, on HBO Max. Starring Jean Smart, Hannah Einbinder, and Carl Clemons-Hopkins, the series centers on the professional relationship between a young comedy writer and a legendary stand-up comedienne. The series received critical acclaim and won accolades including Primetime Emmy Awards for Outstanding Writing, Outstanding Directing, and for Smart, Outstanding Lead Actress, as well as the Golden Globe Award for Best Television Series – Musical or Comedy. In June 2021, the series was renewed for a second season, which premiered on May 12, 2022. In June 2022, the series was renewed for a third season.

Premise
Deborah Vance, a legendary Las Vegas stand-up comedy diva, needs to re-invent her aging act to avoid losing her residency at the Palmetto Casino. Ava is a young comedy writer who is unable to find work due to an insensitive tweet and her reputation for being self-centered and arrogant. When Ava's manager sends her to work as Deborah's new head writer, the two slowly bond as Ava pushes her new boss to take more risks and Deborah, in turn, helps Ava start to work through her personal problems.

Cast and characters

Main
 Jean Smart as Deborah Vance, a legendary Las Vegas stand-up comedian
 Hannah Einbinder as Ava Daniels, a down-on-her-luck comedy writer
 Carl Clemons-Hopkins as Marcus, COO of Deborah's management company and her closest advisor

Recurring
 Kaitlin Olson as Deborah "DJ" Vance Jr., Deborah's estranged daughter
 Christopher McDonald as Marty Ghilain, CEO of the Palmetto Casino
 Paul W. Downs as Jimmy LuSaque, Deborah and Ava's manager
 Mark Indelicato as Damien, Deborah's personal assistant
 Rose Abdoo as Josefina, Deborah's estate manager
 Megan Stalter as Kayla, the airhead daughter of Jimmy's boss, who works as his assistant
 Poppy Liu as Kiki, Deborah's personal blackjack dealer
 Johnny Sibilly as Wilson, a water inspector who gets entangled with Marcus
 Angela Elayne Gibbs as Robin, Marcus' mother
 Jane Adams as Nina Daniels, Ava's mother
 Lorenza Izzo as Ruby, Ava's ex-girlfriend
 Luenell as Miss Loretta, Robin's best friend
 Joe Mande as Ray, a hotel clerk for the Palmetto
 Lauren Weedman as Madam Mayor Pezzimenti, mayor of Las Vegas

Guest
 Jefferson Mays as T.L. Gurley, an antique dealer who holds a grudge against Deborah
 Brent Sexton (season 1) and W. Earl Brown (season 2) as Michael, Jimmy's boss and Kayla's father
 Jeff Ward as George, a man Ava meets and bonds with
 Paul Felder as Aidan, DJ’s mixed martial artist husband.
 Louis Herthum as Dennis Daniels, Ava's father
 Anna Maria Horsford as Francine, a veteran comedian who is an old friend of Deborah
 Linda Purl as Kathy Vance, Deborah's estranged sister
 Chris Geere and Kirby Howell-Baptiste as Jesse and Daisy, two British TV producers who interview Ava
 Amanda Payton as Jackie
 Martha Kelly as Barbara, a human resources representative (season 2)
 Ming-Na Wen as Janet Stone, a talent agent and Jimmy's rival (season 2)
 Laurie Metcalf as "Weed"/Alice, an eccentric tour manager (season 2)
 Wayne Newton as himself (season 2)
 Margaret Cho as herself (season 2)
 Harriet Harris as Susan, an old friend of Deborah (season 2)
 Susie Essman as Elaine Carter, a director and an old friend of Deborah (season 2)
 Devon Sawa as Jason (season 2)

Episodes

Season 1 (2021)

Season 2 (2022)

Production
In May 2020, HBO Max announced that it had picked up the series and that Jean Smart would star. Additional casting was announced in February 2021. Because of the COVID-19 pandemic, actors held table reads over Zoom, there were no cast parties during production, and stars Smart and Clemons-Hopkins did not even meet each other in person until minutes before filming began. In June 2021, HBO Max renewed the series for a second season, and the cast added Laurie Metcalf, Martha Kelly, and Ming-Na Wen in recurring roles and Margaret Cho as a guest star. In June 2022, HBO Max renewed the series for a third season. In September 2022, the showrunners revealed that a time jump would take place between the second and third season.

Release
Hacks premiered on May 13, 2021, with a two-episode release. Two episodes were released on a weekly basis through June 10, 2021, for the remainder of the 10-episode first season. The second season premiered on May 12, 2022, with a two-episode release weekly. HBO announced that the third season is scheduled for release in 2023.

The first season of Hacks premiered on Amazon Prime Video in the United Kingdom on April 1, 2022.

Reception

Critical response

The first season received critical acclaim. The review aggregator Rotten Tomatoes reported a "Certified Fresh" approval rating of 100% based on 74 critic reviews, with an average rating of 8.30/10. The website's critics consensus states, "A prickling debut that pulls few punches, Hacks deftly balances its sharp critiques of the comedy world with more intimate moments, all the while giving the incomparable Jean Smart a role worthy of her talents – and an excellent partner in Hannah Einbinder." Metacritic calculated a weighted average score of 82 out of 100 based on 24 critics, indicating "universal acclaim".

The second season has also received critical acclaim. On Rotten Tomatoes it also received "Certified Fresh" approval rating of 100% based on 51 critic reviews, with an average rating of 8.70/10. The website's critics consensus states, "Hacks hits the road, but Jean Smart and Hannah Einbinder remain very much at home with each other in a sterling sophomore season that finds novel ways to deepen the central pair's lovable friendship." On Metacritic, it received a score of 88 out of 100 based on 24 critics, indicating "universal acclaim".

Awards and nominations

Notes

References

External links
 
 
 
 Official season 2 finale screenplay

 
2020s American comedy-drama television series
2020s American LGBT-related comedy television series
2020s American LGBT-related drama television series
2021 American television series debuts
Bisexuality-related television series
English-language television shows
HBO Max original programming
Primetime Emmy Award-winning television series
Television series about comedians
Television series by 3 Arts Entertainment
Television series by Fremulon
Television series by Universal Television
Television shows set in Las Vegas